John Acker (October 30, 1870 – April 6, 1933) was an American businessman and politician.

Acker was born on a farm near Savanna, Illinois. He was in the real estate and construction business. He also worked as an Illinois Highway inspector. Acker served on the Savanna City Council and was a Democrat. He served in the Illinois House of Representatives from 1925 until his death in 1933. Acker died from a heart attack at his home in Savanna, Illinois.

Notes

External links

1870 births
1933 deaths
People from Savanna, Illinois
Businesspeople from Illinois
Illinois city council members
Democratic Party members of the Illinois House of Representatives